Mobility 2030 is the name of two different transport plans:

Mobility 2030 (Atlanta)
Mobility 2030 (WBCSD), of the World Business Council for Sustainable Development